A disjunctive pronoun is a stressed form of a personal pronoun reserved for use in isolation or in certain syntactic contexts.

Examples and usage
Disjunctive pronominal forms are typically found in the following contexts. The examples are taken from French, which uses the disjunctive first person singular pronoun moi. The (sometimes colloquial) English translations illustrate similar uses of me as a disjunctive form.
in syntactically unintegrated disjunct (or "dislocated") positions
Les autres s'en vont, mais moi, je reste.
 The others are leaving, but me, I'm staying.
in elliptical constructions (often "sentence fragments") with no verb (e.g. short answers)
Qui veut du gâteau ? Moi.
 Who wants cake? Me. (cf. "I do")
Il est plus âgé que moi.
 He is older than me. (cf. "I am")
in the main clause of a cleft sentence
C'est moi que vous cherchez.
 It's me that you're looking for.

Disjunctive pronouns are often semantically restricted. For example, in a language with grammatical gender, there may be a tendency to use masculine and feminine disjunctive pronouns primarily for referring to animate entities.
Si l'on propose une bonne candidate, je voterai pour elle.
 If someone proposes a good candidate, I'll vote for her.
Si l'on propose une bonne loi, je voterai pour elle.
 If someone proposes a good law, I'll vote for her (it).

"It's me" 

In some languages, a personal pronoun has a form called a disjunctive pronoun, which is used when it stands on its own, or with only a copula, such as in answering to the question "Who wrote this page?" The natural answer for most English speakers in this context would be "me" (or "It's me"), parallel to moi (or C'est moi) in French. Unlike in French, however, where such constructions are considered standard, English pronouns used in this way have caused dispute. Some grammarians contend that the correct answer should be "I" or "It is I" because "is" is a linking verb and "I" is a predicate nominative, and up until a few centuries ago spoken English used pronouns in the subjective case in such sentences. However, since English has lost noun inflection and now relies on word order, using the objective case me after the verb be like other verbs seems natural to modern speakers.

"It is I" developed from the Old and Middle English form "It am I". "It" was used as the complement of "am", but in modern English "it" is the subject.

See also
 English personal pronouns
 French personal pronouns
 Intensive pronoun
 Irish morphology
 Subjective pronoun
 Weak pronoun
 Copula

References

Personal pronouns